Sir Richard Mill, 5th Baronet (c. 1689–1760) of Woolbeding House, Sussex was a British landowner and politician who sat in the House of Commons between 1721 and 1747.

Mill was the second son of Sir John Mill, 3rd Baronet of Woolbeding and his wife Margaret Grey, daughter. of Thomas Grey of Woolbeding. He succeeded his brother John in the baronetcy in 1706  He matriculated at St John's College, Oxford on 12 March 1708, aged 18. On 12 March 1713, he married. Mary Knollys, daughter of Robert Knollys of Grove Place, Nursling, Hampshire.

Mill was brought in by the Duke of Somerset to fill a vacancy at  Midhurst and was returned unopposed as Member of Parliament  at a by-election on 6 November 1721. He did not stand at the 1722 general election. In 1723 he was High Sheriff of Hampshire. He was brought in again at a by-election at Midhurst on 1 February 1729 and represented the borough until 1734. At the  1734 general election he was elected MP for Penryn in the interest of Richard Edgcumbe. He was returned unopposed for Horsham  at the  1741 general election by the 7th Viscount Irwin at the request of the Duke of Newcastle. He voted with the Administration consistently  and retired in 1747.

Mill died on 16 May 1760. He had four sons Richard, John, Henry, and Charles who succeeded to the baronetcy in turn. His five daughters were Margaret, Philadelphia, Elizabeth, Mary and Martha.

References

1680s births
1760 deaths
High Sheriffs of Hampshire
British MPs 1715–1722
British MPs 1722–1727
British MPs 1727–1734
British MPs 1734–1741
British MPs 1741–1747
Members of the Parliament of Great Britain for English constituencies
Baronets in the Baronetage of England